The AMP Singapore, formerly known as the Association of Muslim Professionals, is a non-profit organisation serving the Muslim community in Singapore. AMP is a registered charitable organisation and is accorded the status of an Institution of Public Character.

Established on 10 October 1991, it is guided by its core principles of being independent, non-partisan and working in critical collaboration with all parties that share its mission to bring about a Dynamic Muslim Community in the 21st Century. Its mission is to be a thought leader, problem solver and mobiliser for the advancement of the community.  
 
AMP offers programmes and services for various demographics and those in need of counselling services. It offers this through its Family Services, Marriage Hub, Training & Education and Youth departments.

History 

There had been unease in the Malay/Muslim community in Singapore since the mid 1980s. The population census in 1980 showed that the community was overrepresented in areas such as unemployment, drug addiction, and divorce, and not performing well in areas such as education and socioeconomic development. It was during this tumultuous period that a group of Malay/ Muslim professionals felt that something urgent needed to be done to provide some direction to the community. They then decided on a Convention as the most ideal platform to share their thoughts and plans to promote the progress and development of the community.

Subsidiaries 
AMP has two wholly-owned subsidiaries and a youth wing: a full-fledged research centre, Centre for Research on Islamic and Malay Affairs (RIMA), a provider of child and youth education, MERCU Learning Point and Young AMP.

Centre for Research on Islamic and Malay Affairs 

Formerly the research division of AMP, the Centre for Research on Islamic and Malay Affairs (RIMA) was converted to a full-fledged research centre in February 1998. Its purpose is to undertake research to provide leadership in Malay and Muslim affairs. RIMA conducts research programmes in a number of key areas, which include economics, education, religion, social, leadership and civil society.

MERCU Learning Point 

MERCU Learning Point is a private education centre that offers a range of programmes and services for children aged 2 months to 12 years. Its network comprises nine childcare centres, six school-based student care centres and two kindergarten care centres, including an enrichment wing. It prides in establishing a collaborative environment with parents and schools as important catalysts in the children's development. With the tagline Starting Young, Aiming High, its programmes are robustly designed to maximise the children's capabilities and propel them to greater heights. MERCU serves about 2,000 children every month at its 17 centres located island wide in Singapore.

Young AMP 

The youth wing of AMP, Young AMP, organizes seminars and workshops to encourage critical thinking among youths, equip them with skills and knowledge aimed at developing their capacity to the future leaders of the community, as well as expose them to other relevant issues at the national and global levels.

Signature Programmes

Adopt a Family & Youth Scheme 

The Adopt a Family & Youth Scheme provides holistic assistance to low-income families. It was introduced in 1999 to encourage self-reliance within disadvantaged families. Under the scheme, families are assisted through financial assistance and management, economic empowerment, socio-educational and parental education programmes, and family life skills workshops.

Debt Advisory Centre 

The Debt Advisory Centre (DAC), which was launched in 2013, is a one-stop centre that assists individuals facing debt problems through a three-pronged approach: advice, educate and research. It provides a roadmap for debtors to have a clearer picture of the options that are available to them.

The DAC is open to individuals from all races and religious affiliations, who are facing debt problems.

Development & Reintegration Programme 

The Development & Reintegration Programme was introduced in 2018 to assist offenders and their families through an individualised intervention plan, in-care and aftercare engagements, and financial and socio-educational assistance.

Board of Directors 
Notable former board members of AMP include Saktiandi Supaat, Member of Parliament for Bishan-Toa Payoh GRC; Zhulkarnain Abdul Rahim, Member of Parliament for Chua Chu Kang GRC; Azmoon Ahmad, former Nominated Member of Parliament and Mohd Ismail Hussein, also a former Nominated Member of Parliament.

AMP's current chairman is Dr. Md Badrun Nafis Saion, a Specialist in Paediatric Dentistry at Q & M Dental Care. He has been chairman of the association since 2019 and has been a board member of AMP since 2014. He was concurrently the chairman of the Nominating and Fund Raising committees of AMP.

AMP's vice-chairman is Mr. Hazni Aris, an Assistant Vice President for Business Development with Tokio Marine Life. He is also President of Young AMP, the youth wing of AMP. He has been a board member of AMP since 2017 and is concurrently the chairman of the Media & Relations Resource Panel of AMP.

References

External links 
 Official Website

Organisations based in Singapore
1991 establishments in Singapore
Islam in Singapore